Dagoretti High School is a high school in the Dagoretti area of Nairobi county, Kenya. It is a Provincial School located 16 Kilometres from the Nairobi City centre along the Nairobi-Kikuyu Road. The School has five streams (as from 2008) E, W, N, S, A. It is a boarding school with a student population of roughly 900.

History
Dagoretti High School was founded in 1962. The school used to be a colonial detention camp where many MAU MAU detainees were incarcerated. It was popularly known as Dago or DITCHEZ. Dagoretti High School was started through the initiative of the first Member of Parliament for Dagoretti Constituency Dr Njoroge Magana Mungai.The first Headmaster of the school was Mr N C Bhatt.

Extracurricular activities
Dagoretti High School dominated the Traditional Dance category of the Kenya National Drama festivals throughout the 1990s holding the High Schools Category for many years and in 2004 and 2005 Drama Festivals the school made history by winning consecutive drama dance titles. Also the school has clubs that help involve the students in social activities and campaigns. e.g. SCAD (Students Campaign Against Drugs), St. John Club, Computer Club, Science Club etc.

In 2011 the school came tops in the Junior Achievement National in Kenya, and in October of the same year represented Kenya in the Pan African Contest in Ghana. They emerged champions in Kenya with their Portable hot water iron box named the D~Box.
The company consisted of 11 students:
Brian Thungu, Timon Ochieng , David Adera, Joe muchuha, Elijah Maina, Collins Otieno, Daniel Aburi, Owen, Ron Shalom, Emmanuel Kyalo, Charis Kavita. All were form 3 students that year except Ron Shalom who was a form 2 student at the time

Notable alumni
 Dr. Alfred Mutua - Former government spokesman, current Machakos Governor
Kevin Wyre - Pop Artist
Ferdinand Waititu- Fmr. Governor for Kiambu County
John Kiarie - Member of Parliament, Dagoretti South
Renson Michael - Content Curator, TRACE EA

References

High schools and secondary schools in Kenya
1962 establishments in Kenya
Educational institutions established in 1962
Schools in Nairobi